Charles Dinnie (born 1887) was a professional footballer, who played for Dundee & Huddersfield Town.

References

1887 births
Year of death missing
Scottish footballers
Association football defenders
English Football League players
Dundee F.C. players
Huddersfield Town A.F.C. players
People from Arbroath
Footballers from Angus, Scotland